The 2012 TTA – Racing Elite League season was the only season of the new Racing Elite League run by the Touring Car Team Association. The championship was formed as a breakaway from the Scandinavian Touring Car Championship.  Following the season, the two series announced their reunification, under the STCC name but with the TTA technical regulations. Fredrik Ekblom won the championship, driving for Volvo Polestar Racing.

Teams and drivers

Race calendar and results

Points standings

Drivers championship
Points are awarded to the top 10 classified finishers.

Points were also awarded to the top 3 in qualifying.

The driver who sets the fastest lap will also receive 1 extra point.

Notes:
1 2 3 refers to the classification of the drivers in qualifying, where bonus points are awarded 3–2–1 for the fastest three drivers.
italics signifies fastest lap.

Teams championship

Notes:
1 2 3 refers to the classification of the drivers in qualifying, where bonus points are awarded 3–2–1 for the fastest three drivers.

Manufacturers championship

References

External links

Official website of the TTA 

2012 in motorsport
2012 in Swedish motorsport
Motorsport competitions in Sweden